Public relations is the practice of managing and disseminating information to the public in order to affect their perception.

Public Relations can also refer to:

  (1945–1994), was an open-access peer-reviewed, electronic academic journal covering topics having to do with public relations and communication studies.
  (1975-),  a peer-reviewed academic journal.
  (1945-), a sociology book by Edward Bernays.
  (2004–present), a Czech rock band.
 , a TV episode of Arrested Development.
 , a TV episode of Mad Men.
 , a communications management occupation title.

See also 
 
 
 PR (disambiguation)
 list of public relations journals